Centropyxiella elegans is a species of Amoebozoa in the family Centropyxidae. It is found in the European waters of the North Atlantic Ocean.

References

External links 

 

Tubulinea
Species described in 1970